Rovt pod Menino is a dispersed settlement in the hills south of Šmartno ob Dreti in the Municipality of Nazarje in Slovenia. The area belongs to the traditional region of Styria and is now included in the Savinja Statistical Region.

Name
The name of the settlement was changed from Sveti Jošt (literally, 'Saint Jodocus') to Rovte pri Nazarjih (literally, 'clearing near Nazarje') in 1955. The name was changed on the basis of the 1948 Law on Names of Settlements and Designations of Squares, Streets, and Buildings as part of efforts by Slovenia's postwar communist government to remove religious elements from toponyms. The name of the settlement was changed again from Rovte pri Nazarjih to Rovt pod Menino in 1963.

Churches

The local church built on an isolated hill in the east of the settlement, is dedicated to Saint Josse and belongs to the Parish of Šmartno ob Dreti. It dates to the late 13th and early 14th centuries with some later additions. There is a second church close by. It is dedicated to Saints Gervasius and Protasius.

References

External links

Rovt pod Menino on Geopedia

Populated places in the Municipality of Nazarje